A paratrooper helmet is a type of combat helmet used by paratroopers and airborne forces. The main difference from standard combat helmets is that paratrooper helmets have a different harness and lining to withstand impact when jumping from aircraft and to keep the helmet stable in flight, and most have a lower-profile shell to reduce wind resistance. Most modern combat helmets have features making them suitable for airborne use.

Examples

References

Combat helmets
Military parachuting
Paratroopers